Neal Asher (born 4 February 1961) is an English science fiction writer. He lives near Chelmsford.

Career
Both of Asher's parents are educators and science fiction fans. Although he began writing speculative fiction in secondary school, he did not turn seriously to writing until he was 25. He worked as a machinist and machine programmer and as a gardener from 1979 to 1987. Asher identifies The Lord of the Rings, The Hobbit and other fantasy work including Roger Zelazny's The Chronicles of Amber series as important early creative influences.

Asher published his first short story in 1989. In 2000 he was offered a three-book contract by Pan Macmillan, and his first full-length novel Gridlinked was published in 2001. This was the first in a series of novels made up of Gridlinked, The Line of Polity, Brass Man, Polity Agent, and Line War.

Asher is published by Tor, an imprint of Pan Macmillan, in the UK, and by Tor Books in the United States.

The majority of Asher's work is set in one future history, the "Polity" universe. It encompasses many classic science fiction tropes including world-ruling artificial intelligences, androids, hive minds and aliens. His novels are characterized by fast-paced action and violent encounters. While his work is frequently epic in scope and thus nominally space opera, its graphic and aggressive tone is more akin to cyberpunk. When combined with the way that Asher's main characters are usually acting to preserve social order or improve their society (rather than disrupt a society they are estranged from), these influences could place his work in the subgenre known as post-cyberpunk.

Awards
 British Fantasy Society Award nomination, 1999, for stories "Sucker" and "Mason's Rats III"
 SF Review Best Book designation, 2002, for The Skinner

Bibliography

Polity universe

In order of publication

Agent Cormac series
 
 The Line of Polity (2003) 
 Brass Man (2005) 
 Polity Agent (2006) 
 Line War (2008) 

Spatterjay series
 The Skinner (2002) 
 The Voyage of the Sable Keech (2006) 
 Orbus (2009) 

Transformation series
 Dark Intelligence (2015) 
 War Factory (2016) 
 Infinity Engine (2017) 

Rise of the Jain
 The Soldier (May 2018) 
 The Warship (May 2019) 
 The Human (April 2020) 

Standalone novels
 Prador Moon (2006) 
 Hilldiggers (2007) 
 Shadow of the Scorpion (Prequel to Gridlinked, 2008) 
 The Technician (2010) 
 Jack Four (2021) 
 "Weaponized" (2022) 
In internal chronological order
Weaponized (2300 CE)
Prador Moon (2310 CE)
Shadow of the Scorpion (2339 CE)
Gridlinked (2434 CE)
The Line of Polity (2437 CE)
Brass Man (2441 CE)
Polity Agent (2443 CE)
Line War (2444 CE)
The Technician (2457 CE)
Dark Intelligence (Circa. 2500 CE)
War Factory (Circa. 2500 CE)
Infinity Engine (Circa. 2500 CE)
The Soldier (Circa. 2750 CE)
The Warship (Circa. 2750 CE)
The Human (Circa. 2750 CE)
The Skinner (3056 CE)
The Voyage of the Sable Keech (3078 CE)
Orbus (3079 CE)
Jack Four' Hilldiggers (3230 CE)

Owner trilogy
 The Departure (2011) 
 Zero Point (2012) 
 Jupiter War (2013) 

Other novels
 Mindgames: Fool's Mate (1992) 
 The Parasite (1996) 
 Cowl (2004), Philip K. Dick Award nominee 

Short fiction
Collections
 The Engineer (1998) – Contains the novella of the same name and six stories. 
 The Engineer "Snairls"
 "Spatterjay"
 "Jable Sharks"
 "The Thrake"
 "Proctors"
 "The Owner"
 Runcible Tales (1999) 
 "Always with You" (Polity Universe) (1996)
 "Blue Holes" (Polity Universe)
 "Dragon in the Flower" (Polity Universe) (1994)
 "The Gire & the Bibrat" (Polity Universe)
 "Walking John & Bird" (Polity Universe)
 The Engineer ReConditioned (2006) – Reprint of The Engineer with three additional stories. 
 The Engineer "Snairls"
 "Spatterjay"
 "Jable Sharks"
 "The Thrake"
 "Proctors"
 "The Owner"
 "The Tor-Beast's Prison"
 "Tiger Tiger"
 "The Gurnard"
 The Gabble: And Other Stories (2008) 
 "Softly Spoke the Gabbleduck" (Cormac/Gabbleduck)
 "Putrefactors" (Spatterjay)
 "Garp and Geronamid" (Spatterjay)
 "The Sea of Death" (n/a)
 "Alien Archaeology" (Cormac/Gabbleduck)
 "Acephalous Dreams" (Polity)
 "Snow in the Desert" (n/a)
 "Choudapt" (n/a)
 "Adaptogenic" (Spatterjay)
 "The Gabble" (Cormac/Gabbleduck)
 Africa Zero (2005) – Contains three novellas. 
 Africa Zero The Army of God The Sauraman Owning the Future: Short Stories (2018) 
 "Memories of Earth" (from Asimov's Science Fiction October/November 2013)
 "Shell Game" (from The New Space Opera 2 2009)
 "The Rhine's World Incident" (from Subterfuge 2008 and In Space No One Can Hear You Scream 2013)
 "Owner Space" (from Galactic Empires anthology 2008)
 "Strood" (from Asimov's Science Fiction December 2004 and Year's Best SF 10 2005)
 "The Other Gun" (from Asimov's Science Fiction April/May 2013)
 "Bioship" (from Solaris Book of New Science Fiction 2007)
 "Scar Tissue"
 "The Veteran"

List of short stories/novellas

Footnotes

References
Neal Asher page at Authortrek. Online 25 March 2008.Contemporary Authors Online, Gale, 2008. Reproduced in Biography Resource Center. Farmington Hills, Mich.: Gale, 2008. Document Number: H1000162683. Online. 25 March 2008.

 External links 
Neal Asher's personal website
Neal Asher's blog

Neal Asher's online fiction at Free Speculative Fiction Online''
Infinity Plus profile
The ZONE interview
Story behind Zero Point – essay by Neal Asher

1961 births
English science fiction writers
Living people
People from Billericay
Asimov's Science Fiction people
English male novelists